Solnechny is a closed urban locality (a settlement) in Krasnoyarsk Krai, Russia. As of the 2010 Census, its population was 10,384.

History
It was established as a work settlement on October 19, 1965 and was alternatively known as Uzhur-4. It was officially recognized as a closed settlement on July 14, 1992. It was municipally incorporated as an urban okrug on October 6, 2003.

Administrative and municipal status
Within the framework of administrative divisions, it is incorporated as the closed administrative-territorial formation of Solnechny—an administrative unit with the status equal to that of the districts. As a municipal division, the closed administrative-territorial formation of Solnechny is incorporated as Solnechny Urban Okrug.

References

Notes

Sources

Urban-type settlements in Krasnoyarsk Krai
Populated places established in 1965